Sir Thomas Thynne (c.1578–1639), of Longleat, Wiltshire, was an English landowner and politician who sat in the House of Commons at various times between 1601 and 1629. His romance with the daughter of his family's enemies may have inspired Shakespeare to pen Romeo and Juliet.

Life
Thynne was the son and heir of Sir John Thynne of Longleat, a knight of the shire, and Joan Hayward, daughter of Sir Rowland Hayward, a Lord Mayor of London.

Thynne first made his mark in May 1594, at the age of sixteen, when he clandestinely married Maria (or Mary) Touchet, also sixteen, a gentlewoman at the court of Queen Elizabeth and a daughter of Lord Audley. The two were married on the day they first met and for some time kept their marriage secret because their fathers were bitterly opposed to each other, continuing a feud which had begun in the previous generation. When their story became known, Thynne's parents and Joan Thynne in particular, tried unsuccessfully to have the marriage annulled. These events are speculated to have provided the impetus the next year for Shakespeare to produce the play Romeo and Juliet, based on an earlier Italian story that begins with a similar clandestine marriage between feuding families. With Maria, Thynne had three sons, before his wife died in childbirth. Two of these sons survived childhood, James Thynne (died 1670) and Sir Thomas Thynne. Thomas's mother did not forgive him for his marriage and she took out a court case on behalf of her daughters against Thomas.

Maria's surviving correspondence between 1595 and 1611 was published by the Wiltshire Record Society in 1983 under the title Two Elizabethan Women: correspondence of Joan and Maria Thynne. After the death of Maria in 1611, Thynne married secondly Catherine Howard, a daughter of Hon. Charles Howard, son of the first Viscount Howard and niece of Lord Howard of Bindon. With her he had further sons, including Sir Henry Frederick Thynne, 1st Baronet (1615–1680), ancestor of the Marquesses of Bath.

In 1601 Thynne was elected Member of Parliament for Hindon. He was re-elected MP for Hindon in 1604. In the same year, he succeeded his father to the family estates and on his father's death, he had himself returned at a by-election for the county of Wiltshire. However, this election was disallowed by the Commons on the grounds that a sitting member was not eligible to be returned for a second constituency.  Thynne was High Sheriff of Wiltshire for 1607–08. In 1621 he was elected MP for Heytesbury and was re-elected MP for Heytesbury in 1624. He was elected MP for Hindon again in 1625 and was re-elected MP for Hindon in 1626 and 1628.

Among the estates Thynne inherited was one at Kempsford in Gloucestershire, where he built a new country house, demolishing an important fortified manor house which since the 13th century had defended a crossing of the River Thames.

Thynne died on 1 August 1639.

Notes

1570s births
1639 deaths
Knights Bachelor
High Sheriffs of Wiltshire
17th-century English landowners
Thomas
English MPs 1601
English MPs 1604–1611
English MPs 1621–1622
English MPs 1624–1625
English MPs 1625
English MPs 1626
English MPs 1628–1629